Vasyl Pynyashko (born 2 February 1992) is a professional Ukrainian football midfielder.

Career
Born in Uzhhorod, Pynyashko is a product of the local Youth Sportive School.

He played two seasons for Zakarpattia Uzhhorod in the Ukrainian Premier League Reserves, but never made debut for the senior squad. After playing in the local amateur clubs and spent a short time abroad (while played for FK Sobrance in Slovakia), in April 2017 Pynyashko signed contract with FC Mynai and in 2020 was promoted with his teammates into the Ukrainian Premier League. He made his debut in the Ukrainian Premier League for Mynai on 13 September 2020, playing as the start squad player in a winning home match against FC Oleksandriya.

Club

References

External links 
 
 

1992 births
Living people
Sportspeople from Uzhhorod
Ukrainian footballers
Ukrainian expatriate footballers
FC Hoverla Uzhhorod players
FC Uzhhorod players
FC Mynai players
MFA Mukachevo players
Kazincbarcikai SC footballers
Ukrainian Premier League players
Expatriate footballers in Slovakia
Ukrainian expatriate sportspeople in Slovakia
Ukrainian expatriate sportspeople in Hungary
Expatriate footballers in Hungary
Association football midfielders
Ukrainian First League players
Ukrainian Second League players